United Nations Security Council Resolution 159, adopted unanimously on September 28, 1960, after examining the application of the Republic of Mali for membership in the United Nations the Council recommended to the General Assembly that the Republic of Mali be admitted.

Mali, along with the Republic of Senegal, had been admitted under the Mali Federation under Resolution 139, until the federation broke apart on August 20, 1960.

See also
List of United Nations Security Council Resolutions 101 to 200 (1953–1965)

References
Text of the Resolution at undocs.org

External links
 

 0159
 0159
 0159
1960 in Mali
September 1960 events